B.C. Butcher is a 2016 American horror comedy film directed by Kansas Bowling and starring Natasha Halevi, Kato Kaelin, Kadeem Hardison, and Rodney Bingenheimer. The film's plot is about a tribe of cavewomen being stalked by a prehistoric monster. It has been dubbed as "the first prehistoric slasher film".  It was released in January 2016 by Troma Entertainment.

Synopsis
A tribe of cavewomen sacrifice one of their members after it is revealed she is having an affair with the tribe leader's man (Kato Kaelin). They leave her body in the wilderness and it is discovered by a prehistoric beast who falls in love with the dead cavewoman and vows to avenge her death. The monster, known as "The Butcher", hunts down the cavewomen responsible for her murder. The film also features a music video interlude by Los Angeles punk band The Ugly Kids.

Cast

References

External links

2016 films
2016 horror films
American comedy horror films
American independent films
American exploitation films
Camcorder films
2010s exploitation films
Troma Entertainment films
2016 comedy horror films
2016 independent films
2016 comedy films
2010s English-language films
2010s American films